Spectrum Aeronautical is a business jet developer based in Carlsbad, California with its development center located in Spanish Fork, Utah.

An engine failure while flying a single-engine Stinson Voyager over the jungles of Honduras in 1958 nearly killed Spectrum CEO Linden Blue. After this incident he started to design aircraft that had multiple engines.

Since approximately 2006, the company has been involved in the development of two very light jets, the Spectrum S-33 "Independence" and the S-40 "Freedom", which are to be constructed making extensive use of composite materials. The twin-engined single pilot aircraft are supposed to carry between five and nine passengers over distances between circa 3000 and 4000 kilometres, using about 40% less fuel than conventionally built planes. The certification dates of both planes have been postponed on several occasions, even more so after a setback in 2006, when the company's only prototype - a S-33 - crashed, causing the death of two pilots. Further to that, the Global Financial Crash 2008 made the business climate for business jets more restrictive.

The S-33, with an envisaged selling price of just under US-$ 4m, is scheduled to be certified 12 months after the S-40, which is to sell for below US-$ 7m. In recent years Spectrum has sought finance through banks, investors and joint ventures with other aircraft manufacturers. In May 2011 Spectrum president Austin Blue is quoted: "We are still trying to get the programmes advancing, but it is not easy".

Advertised claims 
Spectrum has taken part in the development of composite aircraft which includes the MQ-1 Predator, LearAvia Lear Fan, Beechcraft Starship, Scaled Composites Proteus, Bell Eagle Eye and Williams V-Jet II. 

It gained experience in advanced aerodynamic design, manufacturing process controls, financial management, FAA certification, interior design, marketing, computer based design, quality assurance, distribution and maintenance systems. During these aforementioned projects.
.

Products 
The company is developing two jets:
 Spectrum S-40 Freedom
 Spectrum S-33 Independence

References 

Aircraft manufacturers of the United States
Spanish Fork, Utah
Carlsbad, California